James O'Dowd may refer to:
 James Thomas O'Dowd, American bishop of the Catholic Church
 James Cornelius O'Dowd, deputy Judge Advocate General